Tritiya Adhyay also referred to as Tritiyo Adhyay is a Bengali romantic thriller, directed by Manoj Michigan and starring Abir Chatterjee and Paoli Dam. The film was released on 8 February 2019. At the Darbhanga International Film Festival, the movie won the Best National Feature Film and the Best Screenplay Award at the Expressions Film Festival.

Plot 
Kaushik (played by Abir), a sports teacher, and Shreya (played by Paoli), a botanist, meet after a gap of many years. What follows is a dark romantic thriller, giving the audience a glimpse of why the protagonists had ended their relationship years ago, their reunion in the present, and the possible (or not) future.

Cast 
Abir Chaterjee as Kaushik
Paoli Dam as Shreya
 Sourav Das
 Arunima Halder
 Abhijit Roy

Release
The official trailer of the film was released by Pushprekha International on 20 December 2018.

References

External links
 

2019 films
Bengali-language Indian films
2010s Bengali-language films